Bradley Aerospace, Inc. was an American aircraft manufacturer, founded by Bradley Huggins and based in Chico, California. The company specialized in the design and manufacture of light aircraft in the form of kits for amateur construction.

In April 2015 the company's corporate status was listed as "suspended".

The company marketed a kit for its all-metal aerobatic Bradley BA-100 Aerobat and then went on to design a two-seat aerobatic aircraft, the Bradley BA-200 ATAC, although only one was built. A third design, the Bradley BA-300 Himat, does not seem to have progressed to the completion of a prototype.

Aircraft

References

External links
Company website archives on Archive.org

Defunct aircraft manufacturers of the United States
Homebuilt aircraft